Devante, DeVante or De'Vante is a given name. Notable people with the given name include:
Davante Adams  (born 1992), American football player 
De'Vante Bausby (born 1993), American football player
Devante Bond (born 1993), American football player
Devante Clut (born 1995), Australian football player
Devante Cole (born 1995), English footballer
Devante Downs (born 1995), American football player
De'Vante Harris (born 1993), American football player
Devante Mays (born 1994), American football player
Devante McKain (born 1994), English footballer
DeVante Parker (born 1993), American football player
Devante Parker (born 1996), German footballer
Devante Smith-Pelly (born 1992), Canadian ice hockey player
DeVante Swing (born 1969), American musician